Nimba Airport  is an airport in Liberia near the triple border of Liberia, Côte d'Ivoire, and Guinea. It serves Yekepa, Sanniquellie, and the Nimba Nature Reserve.

See also
Transport in Liberia

References

 OurAirports - Nimba
 Great Circle Mapper - Nimba
 Google Earth

Airports in Liberia